Galovac is a village and a municipality in Croatia in the Zadar County. In the 2011 census, there were 1,234 inhabitants, all in the single settlement of Galovac, 99% of whom were Croats.

References

External links
 

Municipalities of Croatia
Populated places in Zadar County